Weightlifting was contested by both men and women at the 2006 Asian Games in Doha, Qatar from December 2 to December 6, 2006. There are seven weight categories for the women and eight for the men. All competition took place at the Banquet Hall, Al-Dana Club.

India did not take part in this weightlifting events after the government failed to pay a USD$50,000 fine to the International Weightlifting Federation (IWF) to lift their suspension. The IWF suspended India's weightlifting team from any sports events after they failed doping tests during the 2006 Commonwealth Games in Melbourne, Australia.

Iran also had same sanctions after 9 weightlifters failed doping test before the World Championships in Dominican Republic, but after Iran Weightlifting Federation agreed to pay US$400,000, Iran clear to compete.

Schedule

Medalists

Men

Women

Medal table

Participating nations
A total of 173 athletes from 34 nations competed in weightlifting at the 2006 Asian Games:

References

External links

 Results

 
2006 Asian Games events
Asian Games
2006
International weightlifting competitions hosted by Qatar